Joesting is a surname. Notable people with the surname include:
 Herb Joesting (1905–1963), American football player and coach
 John F. Joesting (died 1978), American politician

See also
 Joest (disambiguation)